Shigeru Tamura may refer to:

Shigeru Tamura (photographer) (1909–87), photographer
Akihide Tamura (b. 1947), photographer (also known as Shigeru Tamura)
Shigeru Tamura (illustrator), illustrator, animator, and manga artist